City of Philadelphia may refer to the following ships and other vessels: 

 , 1854, British single screw passenger steam ship wrecked on her maiden voyage
 City of Philadelphia, 1919 EFC Design 1074 ship, built as Lake Elsmere, renamed City of Philadelphia 1923, commercial and U.S. Army service to 1946